De Vishal is a historical building dating from 1769 on the Grote Markt in Haarlem, the Netherlands.

It is built up against the St. Bavochurch. As the name Vishal (fish-hall) literally indicates, it was constructed as a hall for selling fish to replace a much more extensive fish market that extended further into the town square and which dated from 1603, the same year as the Vleeshal (meat-hall) across the square. It was originally an open air market in the middle and the roof with skylight was installed in 1899. It functioned as a fish market until 1941. Today it serves as a gallery for temporary exhibitions of modern art.

References

Website

Commercial buildings completed in 1769
Museums in Haarlem
History of Haarlem
Rijksmonuments in Haarlem
1769 establishments in the Dutch Republic
18th-century architecture in the Netherlands